The discography of Australian recording artist Sarah Blasko consists of six studio albums, one live album, three extended plays and twenty-two singles.

Albums

Studio albums

Live albums

Extended plays

Singles

Singles as lead artist

Charity singles

Other appearances
{| class="wikitable plainrowheaders" style="text-align:center;" border="1"
|+ List of other non-single song appearances
|-
! scope="col" style="width:19em;"| Title
! scope="col" style="width:1em;"| Year
! scope="col" style="width:18em;"| Album
|-
! scope="row" | "Your Way"
| 2003
| Triple J Home and Hosed (The First Harvest)
|-
! scope="row" | "Don't Dream It's Over"
| 2005
| She Will Have Her Way: Songs of Tim and Neil Finn
|-
! scope="row" | "Got You on My Radar", "The Weight Just Right", "Song for Val" & "Got Your Hooks In"
| 2005
| The New Violence by Peabody
|-
! scope="row" | "Flame Trees"
| 2005
| Little Fish
|-
! scope="row" | "Nothing in the Way"
| 2006
| Emptiness Is Our Business by GB3
|-
! scope="row" | "Goodbye Yellow Brick Road"
| 2006
| Triple J - Like a Version 2
|-
! scope="row" | "Bye, Bye Pride" & "Hold Your Horses" (with Darren Hanlon)
| 2007
| Write Your Adventures Down (A Tribute to the Go-Betweens)
|-
! scope="row" | "By This River" (with Holly Throsby)
| 2007
| One of You for Me by Holly Throsby
|-
! scope="row" | "Flame Trees"
| 2010
| Tomorrow, When the War Began
|-
! scope="row" | "Hey Ya!"
| 2011
| Triple J - Like a Version 7
|-
! scope="row" | "I Love It When It Rains"
| 2011
| ReWiggled - A Tribute to the Wiggles
|-
! scope="row" | "Life On Mars"
| 2016
| Triple J - Like a Version 12
|-
! scope="row" | "A Spell" (with Jack Colwell)
| 2020
| Swandream by Jack Colwell
|-

References

Discographies of Australian artists
Pop music discographies